The 1975 Cincinnati Bengals season was the franchise's 6th season in the National Football League, and the 8th overall.

The final season for Paul Brown as head coach, Cincinnati opened the season with six straight wins and went on to post an 11–3 record, their best regular-season mark. The Bengals qualified as the AFC wild card team for the playoffs, but they lost to Oakland, 31–28, in the divisional round of the playoffs. Ken Anderson won his second NFL passing championship. A serious blow was the loss of defensive tackle Mike Reid, who, only 27, retired in the off-season to pursue a career in music.

The team qualified for the postseason for the third time in just eight years of existence, but 1975 would be the last time that the Bengals would do so until 1981. Despite the Bengals' great record, they were only 3–3 in division play, losing twice to the eventual champion Steelers, and losing on the road to what was an 0–9 Cleveland Browns team. Other than division play, the Bengals were 8–0 against teams outside of the AFC Central division.

Offseason

NFL Draft

Personnel

Staff

Roster

Regular season

Schedule

Season summary

Week 1

Week 7

Week 12

Standings

Team stats

Team leaders 
 Passing: Ken Anderson (377 Att, 228 Comp, 3169 Yds, 60.5 Pct, 21 TD, 11 Int, 93.9 Rating)
 Rushing: Boobie Clark (167 Att, 594 Yds, 3.6 Avg, 17 Long, 4 TD)
 Receiving: Isaac Curtis (44 Rec, 934 Yds, 21.2 Avg, 55 Long, 7 TD)
 Scoring: Dave Green, 70 points (10 FG; 40 PAT)

Playoffs

Awards and records 
 Ken Anderson, Led NFL, Passer Rating, 93.9 Rating

References 

 Bengals on Pro Football Reference
 Bengals Schedule on jt-sw.com
 Bengals History on Official Site

Cincinnati Bengals
Cincinnati Bengals seasons
Cincinnati